Rohini Kumari Wijeratne-Kaviratne (born December 12, 1971) is a member of the 15th Parliament of Sri Lanka representing the United National Party.

She is the daughter of former Deputy Minister of Cultural Affairs, K. Y. M. Wijeratne Banda, and the widow of MP Sanjeeva Kaviratne

References 

Sinhalese politicians
Samagi Jana Balawegaya politicians
United National Party politicians
Living people
1971 births
Members of the 15th Parliament of Sri Lanka
Members of the 16th Parliament of Sri Lanka

21st-century Sri Lankan women politicians
Women legislators in Sri Lanka